Derek Thomas (born September 6, 1966) is a former head men's basketball coach at Western Illinois University. His final record in five years with Western Illinois University was 40-104. He is the son of Hall of Fame Kansas City Chiefs defensive back Emmitt Thomas. Thomas has four children.

Derek was an Assistant Basketball coach at the University of Detroit Mercy until resigning in 2012.

References

1966 births
Living people
American men's basketball coaches
American men's basketball players
Atlanta Hawks scouts
Basketball coaches from Texas
Basketball players from Texas
College men's basketball players in the United States
Detroit Mercy Titans men's basketball coaches
Illinois Fighting Illini men's basketball coaches
Johnson County Community College people
Junior college men's basketball players in the United States
Minnesota Golden Gophers men's basketball coaches
Missouri State Bears basketball coaches
People from Marshall, Texas
Saint Louis Billikens men's basketball coaches
University of Missouri–St. Louis alumni
UNLV Runnin' Rebels basketball coaches
Western Illinois Leathernecks men's basketball coaches